Molobaly "Molo" Sissoko (1 January 194522 November 2019) was a Malian football manager who managed Stade Malien, Real Bamako and the Mali national team.

Managerial career
Sissoko was a PE teacher from 1971 to 1972, before studying in Dakar to become a trainer. He helped train in France with FC Epinay and managed his town hall until 1979. In 1982, he returned to Mali and opened a football academy. In 1984, he was approached to manage the Malian club Stade Malien, and then Real Bamako. Altogether he won the Malian Cup three times. He became manager of the  Mali national team, and after his stint in 1993 he was the technical director for the team.

Death
Sissoko died of illness in his hometown Kati, Mali on 22 November 2019.

References

1945 births
2019 deaths
People from Koulikoro Region
Malian football managers
Mali national football team managers
21st-century Malian people